The Gainesville Times is a daily newspaper based in Gainesville, Georgia, that covers Hall County and Northeast Georgia. As of 2019, the general manager is Norman Baggs and the editor in chief is Shannon Casas; headquarters are located at 345 Green Street, NW Gainesville, GA 30501. 

Circulation delivery deadlines are 6:30 am Monday through Friday inside Hall County and 7:30 am in other areas. On weekends the deadline is 7am in all areas. They print daily except for Saturday.

History 
The Gainesville Times was founded after World War II by Charles and Lessie Smithgall under the original name The Gainesville Daily Times. It was first published from 303 Washington Street, Gainesville, Georgia. Ray Hull was the first editor and Sylvan Meyer was his main reporter. The first issue came off a second-hand flat-bed press in a former funeral home on January 26, 1947. Since that Sunday morning, the Times has never missed a run. The newspaper, printed daily Sunday through Friday, began with the printing capacity of eight pages per press run. Its circulation reached about 4,000 before the end of the first year.

In 1952, the Gainesville Daily Times moved around the block to 308 W. Spring Street to share a building known as the Press-Radio Center, also owned by the Smithgalls. That same year a fire started in the composing room but the paper was still released that day with help from other printers around town. Sylvan Meyer soon became managing editor and then head editor, helping the newspaper grow.

In 1957, the newspaper had grown enough to buy a more modern rotary press which allowed the printers to run thirty-two pages per press run. The "Gainesville" was then dropped from the title in an effort to convey a broader coverage area.

In 1970, the Daily Times was able to acquire a new facility on North Green Street to install a new offset press with improved technology. The first paper from this new press was printed on April 27th. The "Daily" was dropped from the newspaper name soon after in 1972.

In 1981, The Times was sold to Gannett Co. Inc. and by the next year, Gannett expanded the press to accommodate printing of USA Today for parts of the Southeast.

In 2004, The Times was sold to Morris Multimedia Inc., the largest privately owned media organization in the United States. The current owner, Metro Market Media, took over in 2018.

Coverage

Sections
News
Life - Articles about lifestyle choices and events
Get Out - Articles about events happening around Northeast Georgia
Sports - Articles on sports teams specifically from Northeast Georgia
Opinion
Obituaries
Columnists
Newsletters
Puzzles

Significant stories 
"County Touches Off Avoidable Firestorm" by The Times Editorial Board. It was described by the Georgia Associated Press as, "Excellent example of holding public officials accountable, spotlighting their efforts to avoid keeping the public informed until it’s to their benefit to do otherwise and laying out the cost in dollars and public trust."

Awards 
Georgia Associated Press Best Feature Photo of the Year 2017

Georgia Associated Press Best Spot News Photo of the Year 2017

Georgia Associated Press Best Picture Story of the Year 2017

Georgia Associated Press Best Editorial Writing of the Year 2017

References 

Newspapers published in Georgia (U.S. state)
Daily newspapers published in the United States